Marion Elizabeth Rodgers is a scholar, author, and editor recognized as the foremost authority on H. L. Mencken.

Mencken scholarship
Rodgers became interested in Mencken while researching Sara Haardt, who had attended Goucher College from whence Rodgers graduated in 1981. She discovered a trove of correspondences between Mencken and his eventual wife which she compiled and edited as the book Mencken and Sara: A Life in Letters: The Private Correspondence of H.L. Mencken and Sara Haardt.

Certainly Mencken’s name came up during the course of my studies. But my real introduction to Mencken was shortly before my graduation from Goucher College, in 1981, while I was researching the papers of Southern writer and alumna Sara Haardt, whom Mencken had married, thereby shattering his reputation as “America’s Foremost Bachelor.” I was putting away one of her scrapbooks in the vault of the library when I literally tripped over a box of love letters between her and Mencken. Taped to the top of the collection was a stern command, written by Mencken, that it was not to be opened until that very year. To say that my life changed at that moment would be an understatement. Suddenly, a door was swung open into Mencken’s life through the tender route of romantic correspondence. In those days my dream was to go to graduate school and write (yet another!) dull thesis on T. S. Eliot. Instead, I focused my degree on the Mencken/Haardt collection, promptly received a book contract, and became hooked.

Rodgers authored a lavishly praised Mencken biography, Mencken: The American Iconoclast. Joseph C. Goulden, founder of The Mencken Society, declared Rodgers’ book to be "the most superb and entertaining biography (in any field) that I’ve read in years.” Kirkus Reviews praised the book as “The best biography of Mencken to date.” The Blade found it to be “by far the best Mencken biography ever written...a masterpiece.” Publishers Weekly commended it as "a meticulous portrait of one of the most original and complicated men in American letters.” Boston Globe writer Martin F. Nolan declared the biography "the best ever on the sage of Baltimore, is exhaustive but never exhausting, and offers readers more than moderate intelligence and an awfully good time." Terry Teachout, who had previously written his own Mencken biography, offered a mixed review of the Rodgers book. He called her book "absorbing, even indispensable reading for anyone who already has a well-informed interest in H. L. Mencken." But, wrote Teachout, "Rodgers appears to be writing about Mencken the libertarian, a devout believer in 'liberty up to the extreme limits of the feasible and tolerable,' but on closer inspection it becomes clear that she takes his political and philosophical ideas, such as they are, at something like face value, rarely stopping to probe below the surface."

For the Library of America Rodgers edited a reprint of Mencken's Prejudices books, as well as an expanded edition of Mencken's three memoirs known as the Days books.

Personal life
Rodgers was born October 31, 1958 in Santiago, Chile, the daughter of Chilean Maria Arce Fernandez and American William Livingston Rodgers, a businessman and United States Agency for International Development official who died in 2021. She has a sister, Linda Suben, and a brother, William Rodgers. Having met him at a tribute to the Baltimore Evening Sun, she married journalist Jules Witcover on June 21, 1997 in the rear garden of his historic home in Georgetown, in Washington, D.C.

Selected works as author, editor, contributor

Books
Mencken and Sara: A Life in Letters: The Private Correspondence of H.L. Mencken and Sara Haardt (McGraw-Hill Companies, 1987)
The Impossible H.L. Mencken: A Selection of His Best Newspaper Stories, editor (Anchor, 1991)
Mencken: The American Iconoclast (Oxford University Press, 2005)
Notes on Democracy: A New Edition (by H. L. Mecken), introduction and annotation (Dissident Books, 2008)
Prejudices: The Complete Series, editor and annotatation (Library of America 2010)

Selected Articles
By His Own Rules: H. L. Mencken, a cigar always in hand, was the most influential commentator of his time (Cigar Aficionado, Summer 1994)
H.L. Mencken: Courage in a Time of Lynching (Nieman Reports, Summer 2006)
The Last Trials of Clarence Darrow (review, The Washington Times, August 16, 2009)
Louisa May Alcott: The Woman Behind Little Women (review, The Washington Times, November 1, 2009)
Anne Frank: The Book, The Life, The Afterlife (review, The Washington Times, December 6, 2009)
Mark Twain: Man in White: The Grand Adventure of His Final Years (review, The Washington Times, April 9, 2010)
Animal Factory: The Looming Threat of Industrial Pig, Dairy, and Poultry Farms to Humans and the Environment (review, The Washington Times, April 23, 2010)
H.L. Mencken would skewer Hillary Clinton and Donald Trump (The Washington Times, October 10, 2016)
The Savaging of Laura Ingalls Wilder (The American Spectator, July 6. 2018)
Memories of Edmund Morris (The American Spectator, May 30, 2019)
H.L. Mencken on Independence Day: 'We Have Borne Rascality Since 1776, and We Continue To Survive’ (Reason, July 3, 2019)
The Alt-Right Loves H.L. Mencken. The Feeling Would Not Have Been Mutual. (Reason, September 12, 2018)
H. L. Mencken: The German-American from Baltimore (speech to The Society for the History of Germans in Maryland, date unknown)
H.L. Mencken on 'Numskull' Presidents, the Spanish Flu, and the Depression H.L. Mencken on 'Numskull' Presidents, the Spanish Flu, and the Depression (Reason, March 20, 2020)

Interviews
Writings of H.L. Mencken (C-SPAN, 2002)
Mencken: The American Iconoclast (C-SPAN, 2005)
Mencken and Making of an Ink-Stained Wretch (C-SPAN 2005)
Marion Elizabeth Rodgers interview, 2006 (Connie Martinson Talks Books, 2006)
The Library of America interviews Marion Elizabeth Rodgers about H. L. Mencken (2010)
Book Interview: “Prejudices” Complete — The World According to H. L. Mencken (The Arts Fuse, October 26, 2010)
Marion Elizabeth Rodgers on the new, expanded edition of H. L. Mencken’s autobiographical trilogy (2014)
More Mencken (Baltimore City Paper, September 9, 2014)

References

External links

1958 births
Living people
20th-century Chilean women writers
21st-century Chilean women writers
Writers from Santiago
Women non-fiction writers